Dmitry Stulov (born 2 January 1994) is a Russian professional ice hockey defenceman. He is currently playing with HC Lada Togliatti of the Kontinental Hockey League (KHL).

Stulov made his Kontinental Hockey League debut playing with HC Lada Togliatti during the 2014–15 KHL season.

Personal
His father Dmitri Stulov (born 1973) is the head coach of Sarmaty Orenburzhya of the Russian under-18 Junior Hockey League.

References

External links

1994 births
Living people
HC Lada Togliatti players
Russian ice hockey defencemen
Sarmaty Orenburzhya players